SCSI target devices provide a number of SCSI diagnostic pages.  These can be used by a Send Diagnostic command to tell a target device to run a specialised self-test.  The Receive Diagnostic Results command is used where the results from the self-test operation are non-trivial.

Most of the common SCSI devices such as disk-drives support only one or two diagnostic pages.  SES devices can support many diagnostic pages.

List of SCSI diagnostic pages
SCSI uses a one byte addressing scheme for diagnostic pages, allowing for a total 256 possible pages.  There is a standard map of diagnostic page addresses shown below.  Note that any given SCSI device type will only support a subset of these diagnostic pages.  

Some diagnostic pages have two different meanings depending on whether they are being used for control purposes (Send Diagnostic command) or to interrogate status (Receive Diagnostic Results command).  Those cases are shown as double entries in the table below using this convention: "control definition / status definition".

00h - list of supported diagnostic pages
01h - SES - configuration
02h - SES - enclosure control / enclosure status
03h - SES - help text
04h - SES - string out / string in
05h - SES - threshold out / SES threshold in
06h - SES - obsolete
07h - SES - element descriptor
08h - SES - short enclosure status
09h - SES - enclosure busy
0Ah - SES - additional element
0Bh - SES - subenclosure help text 
0Ch - SES - subenclosure string out / SES subenclosure string in
0Dh - SES - supported SES diagnostic pages
0Eh - SES - download microcode control / SES download microcode status
0Fh - SES - subenclosure nickname control / SES subenclosure nickname status
10h-1Fh - SES - vendor-specific
20h-2Fh - SES - reserved
30h-3Eh - reserved
3Fh - used by the SCSI transport layer
40h - disk/optical - translate address
41h-7Fh - reserved
80h-FFh - vendor-specific

SCSI